Kevin Charles McNulty (born October 28, 1954) is a United States district judge of the United States District Court for the District of New Jersey.

Early life and education 

Born October 28, 1954, McNulty earned a Bachelor of Arts degree in 1976 from Yale University and a Juris Doctor in 1983 from New York University School of Law. After law school, McNulty served as a law clerk for Judge Frederick Bernard Lacey of the United States District Court for the District of New Jersey.

Professional career 

For three years at the start of his law career, McNulty served as an associate at a law firm. He then joined the United States Attorney's office in New Jersey, where he served as an Assistant United States Attorney for over a decade. While in the U.S. Attorney's office, McNulty served as deputy chief of the criminal division from 1992 until 1995, and chief of the appeals division from 1995 until 1998. In 1998, McNulty returned to private legal practice, serving as a partner in the Newark, New Jersey law firm Gibbons P.C.

Federal judicial service 

On December 16, 2011, President Obama nominated McNulty to a federal judgeship on the United States District Court for the District of New Jersey to fill the seat vacated by Judge Garrett Brown Jr., who assumed senior status on January 2, 2012. McNulty is the brother in-law of New York senator Chuck Schumer. Senator Frank Lautenberg submitted McNulty's name for consideration late in the process, and some anonymous commentators suggested that it was a political move to ensure Lautenberg had the future support of Schumer. He received a hearing before the Senate Judiciary Committee on March 14, 2012, and his nomination was reported to the floor on April 19, 2012, by voice vote, with Senator Lee recorded as voting no. On July 16, 2012, the Senate confirmed McNulty's nomination by a 91–3 vote. He received his commission on July 18, 2012.

References

External links

1954 births
Living people
Assistant United States Attorneys
Judges of the United States District Court for the District of New Jersey
New York University School of Law alumni
People from Elizabeth, New Jersey
United States district court judges appointed by Barack Obama
21st-century American judges
Yale College alumni